In enzymology, a geranoyl-CoA carboxylase is an enzyme that catalyzes the chemical reaction

ATP + geranoyl-CoA + HCO3-  ADP + phosphate + 3-(4-methylpent-3-en-1-yl)pent-2-enedioyl-CoA

The 3 substrates of this enzyme are ATP, geranoyl-CoA, and HCO3-, whereas its 3 products are ADP, phosphate, and 3-(4-methylpent-3-en-1-yl)pent-2-enedioyl-CoA.

This enzyme belongs to the family of ligases, specifically those forming carbon–carbon bonds.  The systematic name of this enzyme class is geranoyl-CoA:carbon-dioxide ligase (ADP-forming). Other names in common use include geranoyl coenzyme A carboxylase, and geranyl-CoA carboxylase.  It employs one cofactor, biotin.

References

 

EC 6.4.1
Biotin enzymes
Enzymes of unknown structure